Svébohov is a municipality and village in Šumperk District in the Olomouc Region of the Czech Republic. It has about 400 inhabitants.

Notable people
Arnošt Valenta (1912–1944), army officer

References

Villages in Šumperk District